2-Chlorophenol or ortho-chlorophenol is an organic compound with the formula C6H4Cl(OH). It is one of three isomeric monochloride derivatives of phenol. As from occasional use as a disinfectant, it has few  applications.  It is an intermediate in the polychlorination of phenol.
2-Chlorophenol is a colorless liquid, although commercial samples are often yellow or amber-colored. It has an unpleasant, penetrating (carbolic) odor.  It is poorly soluble in water.

See also
 Chlorophenol

References

External links
 ToxFAQs for Chlorophenols, Agency for Toxic Substances and Disease Registry.
 Compound Summary Compendium, PubChem Open Chemistry Database.

Chlorobenzenes
Phenols
Disinfectants
Foul-smelling chemicals